Mac Elvis (born Mutalya Mark Elvis; December 1, 1987 - October 18, 2013)), was a Ugandan gospel musician and music producer. He drowned in a swimming pool while on a trip in Dar es Salam.

Early life and education
Mac Elis was born on 1 December 1987. He lost his parents at the age of 6. Through Watoto Church's ministry to orphaned and vulnerable children, he was supported with his education. After completing high school, Elvis went into studio in the hopes that his dream to make music will become a reality.

Music
Mac Elvis was raised by a church ministry. He had a passion for music and recorded and released his first album "Yo Love" in 2009. With the album, he embarked on a high school tour to promote it and spread the gospel to the youth. His second album, "Church boy" was recorded in 2011. He had attained depth in his lyrics and honed his production skills. The album put him on a higher level in the music industry. He was nominated twice for the Olive Gospel awards as the best new artiste and best RnB artiste.  He has opened for big acts like Papa San, Kirk Franklin and Cece Winans during their shows in Kampala.

Discography

Songs
Topowa game
Church boy
Mufiirako

Albums
Yo love, 2009
Church boy, 2016

References

External links 
"Renown Gospel Artist Paid Last Respects"
"RIP: Gospel Singer Mac Elvis Died in a Swimming Pool"

1987 births
2013 deaths
21st-century Ugandan male singers
Ugandan gospel musicians
Kumusha